Pick It Up may refer to:

 "Pick It Up" (Famous Dex song), 2017
 "Pick It Up" (Redman song), 1997
 "Pick It Up", a song by Fergie from The Dutchess
 "Pick It Up", a song by Lil Mama from VYP (Voice of the Young People)
 "Pick It Up", a song by Luke Bryan from What Makes You Country
 Pick It Up, an album by Planetshakers
 Pick It Up, an album by Relâche